Patricia Smith (February 20, 1930 – January 2, 2011) Born in New Haven, Connecticut, was an American actress who appeared in film and television roles from the early 1950s through the 1990s.

Career
Smith appeared in a 1953 episode of Kraft Television Theater titled "A Room and a Half". A Neighborhood Playhouse alumna  and a life member of The Actors Studio, Smith appeared in two films in 1957, The Bachelor Party with Don Murray and The Spirit of St. Louis with James Stewart.

Smith appeared in Gunsmoke in 1958, season three episode 18 "Buffalo Man", and again in 1961, season six episode 35 “Chester’s Dilemma”. She primarily starred on television during the 1960s and 1970s, including the role of murderer Wanda Buren in the 1965 Perry Mason episode "The Case of the Candy Queen" and the role of Sylvia Bayles in The Twilight Zone episode "Long Distance Call" (season two, episode 22); as Norma Bartlett. Her other roles included, The Fugitive episode "Goodbye my Love" in 1967 and was the focus of the second Hawaii Five-O show of the first season (1968), "Full Fathom Five", playing detective Joyce Weber. She appeared in a 1975 episode of The Streets of San Francisco. She also guest-starred on two episodes of Cannon including the role of Gwen O'Connor in the 1971 episode "Call Unicorn" and the role of Emily Matthews in the 1976 episode "The Reformer.

Smith was a regular on the 1969-70 short-lived television sitcom The Debbie Reynolds Show playing Reynolds' sister Charlotte. Patricia Smith had an earlier role in the second season of Barnaby Jones, episode titled, "Blind Terror". She had a recurring role on The Bob Newhart Show during its initial season (1972–1973), played Jack Lemmon's wife in the 1973 feature film Save the Tiger, and appeared in the episode "You're Not Alone" from the 1977 anthology series Quinn Martin's Tales of the Unexpected (known in the United Kingdom as Twist in the Tale). She also appeared on the TV series Highway to Heaven in the season-one episode "A Child of God".

Smith continued to appear in supporting roles on television and in films through the late 1990s. She played the role of an old looking Doctor Sara Kingsley - a young doctor in her mid 30s turning old due to being afflicted by accelerated aging, deteriorating fast in the course of the story- in the Star Trek: The Next Generation episode "Unnatural Selection". Her final acting role was in the 1997 film Mad City.

Personal life
Smith was married to John Lasell,

Partial filmography

 The Bachelor Party (1957) - Helen Samson
 The Spirit of St. Louis (1957) - Mirror Girl
 Barney (1965, TV Movie) - Patricia
 Where's Everett (1966, TV Movie) - Sylvia Baker
 Paint Your Wagon (1969) - Dance Hall Girl (uncredited)
 The Girl Who Knew Too Much (1969) - Tricia Grinaldi
 Helen Keller and Her Teacher (1970) - Mrs. Keller
 Save the Tiger (1973) - Janet Stoner
 Ace Eli and Rodger of the Skies (1973) - Mrs. Wilma Walford
 I Love You... Good-bye (1974) - Gwen
 A Case of Rape (1974, TV Movie) - Marge Bracken
 Tell Me Where It Hurts (1974, TV Movie) - Naomi
 Planet Earth (1974, TV Movie) - Skylar (uncredited)
 Returning Home (1975, TV Movie) - Mrs. Cameron
 Roots: The Next Generations (1979, TV Mini-Series) - Mrs. Randall
 Diary of a Teenage Hitchhiker (1979, TV Movie) - Marion Burke
 The Scarlett O'Hara War (1980, TV Movie) - Louise Knight
 Who Will Love My Children? (1983, TV Movie) - Cleta Thomas
 Making of a Male Model (1983, TV Movie) - Mrs. Rockwell
 Into Thin Air (1985, TV Movie) - Olga Conway
 Who Is Julia? (1986, TV Movie) - Marlene
 Mimi Me (1991, TV Movie)
 Malibu Summer (1993) - Patient's Wife
 Mad City (1997) - Jenny's Mother (final film role)

References

External links

 
 
 
 Obituary - Los Angeles Times

1930 births
2011 deaths
American film actresses
American television actresses
20th-century American actresses
Actresses from New Haven, Connecticut
Deaths from diabetes
21st-century American women